The Newport Formation is a geologic formation outcropping in the Sydney Basin in eastern Australia. This stratum is up to 49 metres thick. Formed in the mid-Triassic, it is part of the Narrabeen Group of sedimentary rocks.

See also 

 Sydney Basin
 Bald Hill Claystone
 Garie Formation
 Narrabeen group

References 

Geologic formations of Australia
Triassic Australia
Sandstone formations
Geology of New South Wales